Longitarsus zangherii is a species of beetle in the subfamily Galerucinae that can be found in Romagna, Italy.

References

Z
Beetles described in 1968
Endemic fauna of Italy
Beetles of Europe